Julie Crooks is a Canadian curator, researcher and instructor. She has been the head of the department of Arts of Global Africa and the Diaspora at the Art Gallery of Ontario since its founding 2020.

Biography 
Crooks was born in England and is the sister-in-law of athlete Charmaine Crooks. She emigrated to Canada with her family in 1968 where she attended St. Joseph's College School. She completed an undergraduate degree in interdisciplinary studies and a MA in English Literature at York University. Crooks completed her PhD at SOAS University of London in 2014. After completing her studies she was a Rebanks Post Doctoral Fellow at the Royal Ontario Museum from 2014 to 2016. During that time she co-curated the exhibit Here We Are Here: Black Canadian Contemporary Art African collection curator Silvia Forni and Haitian-born researcher Dominique Fontaine.

Crooks joined the Art Gallery of Ontario (AGO) as Assistant Curator of Photography in 2017. She curated her first exhibit Free Black North the same year. Featuring photographs from the Archives of Ontario and Brock University's Archives & Special Collections, the exhibit focused on the lives of descents of Black refugees and formally enslaved people from the United States living in southern Ontario during the mid-to-late 1800s. In 2018 Crooks worked with Mickalene Thomas on a solo exhibit of the visual artist's work.
As photography curator she played an integral role in the acquisition of the Montgomery Collection consisting of more than 3,500 of historical images documenting life in the Caribbean islands.

In 2020 the AGO named Crooks as the head of the newly established department of Arts of Global Africa and the Diaspora aimed at developing collections from the African continent and diaspora.

See also 

 Women in the art history fields

References

Canadian art curators
Living people
People of Sierra Leone Creole descent
York University alumni
Alumni of SOAS University of London
Canadian art historians
Women art historians
Year of birth missing (living people)
Canadian women curators